Norway was represented in the Eurovision Song Contest 2005 by the song "In My Dreams" performed by Wig Wam. The song was written and composed by Trond “Teeny” Holter.

Before Eurovision

Melodi Grand Prix 2005 
Melodi Grand Prix 2005 was the Norwegian national final that selected Norway's entry for the Eurovision Song Contest 2005.

Competing entries 
The rules for the national final were changed for the 2005 contest, which involved the broadcaster directly inviting certain artists and composers to compete, instead of opening a public call for submissions.

Final 
The final was held on 5 March 2005 at the Spektrum in Oslo, and was hosted by Ivar Dyrhaug. The winner was selected over two rounds of public televoting. In the first round, the top four entries were selected to proceed to the second round, the superfinal. In the superfinal, the results of the public televote were revealed by Norway's five regions and led to the victory of "In My Dreams" performed by Wig Wam with 75,667 votes.

At Eurovision
Because Norway placed 24th at the 2004 contest,	Wig Wam were forced to compete in the Eurovision semi-final, held on 19 May 2005. Group performed 13th, following Estonia and preceding the Romania, Norway qualified to the final, placing 6th in the semi-final and scoring 164 points. In the final they performed 5th, following Romania and preceding Turkey, and achieved 9th place with 125 points.

The spokesperson who revealed Norway's votes for other countries was NRK host Ingvild Helljesen.

Voting

Points awarded to Norway

Points awarded by Norway

References

2005
Countries in the Eurovision Song Contest 2005
2005
Eurovision
Eurovision